The 1987–88 Boise State Broncos men's basketball team represented Boise State University during the 1987–88 NCAA Division I men's basketball season. The Broncos were led by fifth-year head coach Bobby Dye and played their home games on campus at the BSU Pavilion in Boise, Idaho.

In the conference tournament in Bozeman, Montana, the top-seed Broncos received a bye into the semifinals and defeated Idaho State by 31 points. They met the host, third-seeded Montana State, in the final and won by two points. It was Boise State's first conference tourney title (and NCAA Tournament appearance) in twelve years.

Boise State received the automatic bid to the NCAA tournament, and no other Big Sky members were invited to the tournament or  The Broncos were the fourteenth seed in the West region and gave third-seeded Michigan a scare in Salt Lake City, as the Wolverines' large lead eroded in the second half; Michigan prevailed by 

The Broncos were led on the court by junior guard Chris Childs, who went on to a lengthy professional career, ending with nine years

Postseason results

|-
!colspan=6 style=| Big Sky tournament

|-
!colspan=6 style=| NCAA tournament

References

External links
Sports Reference – Boise State Broncos – 1987–88 basketball season

Boise State Broncos men's basketball seasons
Boise State
Boise State
Boise State